Arabella Weir (born 6 December 1957) is a Scottish comedian, actress and writer. She played roles in the comedy series The Fast Show and Posh Nosh, and has written several books, including Does My Bum Look Big in This? Weir has also written for The Independent and The Guardian and the latter's Weekend magazine.

Early life and education
Weir was born in 1957, in San Francisco, California, to Scottish parents. She is the daughter of former British ambassador Sir Michael Weir and his wife,  Alison ( Walker) Weir. She attended nursery school in Washington D.C., where her father was posted as a member of the British diplomatic corps. She later attended the Sacre Coeur Convent in Cairo, and the French Lycee in London.

Both her parents were Scottish, and met while they were studying at the University of Oxford; her father was from Dunfermline and her mother was from the Scottish Borders, daughter of the headmaster of a small boarding school. As a child, Weir spent many holidays in Scotland and describes herself as "culturally Scottish". After her parents' divorce she initially lived with her mother, her two older brothers and her younger sister in the UK. At the age of nine she moved to Bahrain with her father while her brothers were at prep school and her younger sister stayed with their mother.

Weir returned to London after passing the eleven-plus in Bahrain and her father was posted to New York.  She was a pupil at the Camden School for Girls, where her mother was a teacher, and then studied drama at Middlesex Polytechnic. As a teenager, she was a backing singer in the British pub rock band Bazooka Joe, whose bass player was Stuart Goddard, who later became famous as Adam Ant. Weir's terse relationship with her mother later became the subject of her debut one-woman show, Does My Mum Look Big in This?

Career
Weir's television career breakthrough came in 1994 in BBC's The Fast Show; she later also became widely known for her roles in Posh Nosh and Two Doors Down. In addition to acting, Weir contributed several episodes as a writer on The Fast Show and Posh Nosh and has also written for The Independent magazine and for The Guardian newspaper and its Weekend magazine.

In 1998, Weir published the international bestseller Does My Bum Look Big in This?, the title of which was a catchphrase of her character "Insecure Woman" in The Fast Show. In 2000, she published her second novel Onwards and Upwards, followed by Stupid Cupid in 2002.

In 2001, Weir took part in the Weakest Link Comedians Special. In 2006, Weir appeared as a contestant in the first series on Celebrity MasterChef. In 2007, Weir appeared in Skins.

Weir joined the cast of Calendar Girls at London's Noël Coward Theatre in November 2009. She played the role of "Chris Harper" until the play's run in the West End ended in January 2010.

Weir voiced the female incarnation of the Doctor in the Doctor Who Unbound Big Finish episode Exile. American alternative weekly Houston Presss Jef Rouner described her portrayal as "one of the most melancholy of all the Doctors."

Weir appeared in the Doctor Who 2011 Christmas Special The Doctor, the Widow and the Wardrobe.

Weir performed with the original cast from The Fast Show (with the exception of Mark Williams) in six online-only episodes sponsored by the Fosters brand.

From 2013 until 2016 she starred as Jenny in Drifters. In 2015 she joined the team of presenters for BBC Two's Food and Drink programme. She also played a small role in Citizen Khan, in the mid-2010s. She has also appeared with Ready Steady Cook.

Since 2016, she has been starring in the BBC Scotland sitcom Two Doors Down. Weir's performance was criticised by Ben Arnold, commenting in The Guardian "her Scottish accent [is] still a work in progress, it would seem." When Weir was asked about this comment on Richard Herring's RHLSTP comedy podcast, she said she was doing specifically a Paisley accent on the show and that both her parents were from Scotland, which she considers her home. Weir added that Scottish actor David Tennant had responded to the Guardian's comment with the words "What the f*** are they on about, it's impeccable!", and that Ben Arnold (who himself is English) had later said to her he was sorry for making the comment.

In June 2019, Weir premiered her debut one-woman show, Does My Mum Look Big in This?, a comedic analysis of Weir's helter-skelter childhood and her difficult relationship with her late mother. The show's title is a pun on Weir's bestselling novel Does My Bum Look Big in This? She took the show to the 2019 Edinburgh Festival.

Personal life
In 1995 she began a relationship with Jeremy Norton. They have two children. They divorced in 2013.

The actor David Tennant is a close friend of Weir's and is godfather to her younger child  They met while filming the six-part comedy drama Takin' Over the Asylum for BBC Scotland in 1994. Shortly after, Tennant moved to London and lodged with Weir at her house in Crouch End for five years.

Books

Novels
 Does My Bum Look Big in This?: the Diary of an Insecure Woman (1998)
 Onwards and Upwards (2000)
 Stupid Cupid (2002)
 The Rise and Rise of Tabitha Baird (2014), YA
 The Endless Trials of Tabitha Baird (2015), YA

Non-fiction
 The Real Me is Thin: or Why All Women Think They're Fat (2011)

References

External links

Arabella Weir at the British Film Institute

Column archive at The Guardian
 Arabella Weir chooses Joyce Grenfell on BBC Radio 4 Great Lives – listen online: BBC Radio 4 - Great Lives, Series 15, Joyce Grenfell

1957 births
British television actresses
British women comedians
Living people
Alumni of Middlesex University
People educated at Camden School for Girls
People educated at Bedales School
Labour Party (UK) people
British sketch comedians
The Fast Show
Bazooka Joe (band) members